Hypersypnoides submarginata is a species of moth of the family Noctuidae described by Francis Walker in 1865. It is found in India, China, Taiwan, Borneo, Java and Sumatra.

The larvae are irregularly mottled and variegated in brown and white. The head is broader and higher than the thorax.

Subspecies
Hypersypnoides submarginata submarginata
Hypersypnoides submarginata sumatrensis Berio in Berio & D. S. Fletcher, 1958 (Sumatra)

References

Moths described in 1865
Calpinae
Moths of Borneo
Moths of Asia
Moths of Indonesia
Moths of Japan
Moths of Taiwan